"Clues" is the 14th episode of the fourth season of the American science fiction television series Star Trek: The Next Generation, it originally aired on February 11, 1991, in broadcast syndication. The teleplay was written by Bruce D. Arthurs and Joe Menosky from a story by Arthurs and was directed by Les Landau.

Set in the 24th century, the series follows the adventures of the Starfleet crew of the Federation starship Enterprise-D. While en route to investigate a mysterious planet, the entire crew, with the exception of Lieutenant Commander Data, is rendered unconscious by an apparent wormhole. After they revive, Data explains that they were unconscious for only thirty seconds but a variety of clues discovered around the ship seem to indicate that he is lying.

Plot
The Enterprise investigates a T Tauri class star system with a single Class M planet that was picked up on a long-range sensor scan near the Ngame Nebula. As they approach the planet, the ship encounters a wormhole and everyone except Lt. Commander Data briefly loses consciousness. When the crew regains their senses, some of the ship's sensors suggest it has been nearly a day since the wormhole encounter, but Data states they were only out for moments and the ship's instruments were affected by the wormhole. Following Data's suggestion, Captain Picard decides to send a probe into the system to avoid further harm to the ship. The probe reports only the presence of a frozen gas giant instead of the Class M planet from before; again, Data attributes this to the effects of the wormhole.

As the ship moves away from the system, the crew begin to find evidence that does not support Data's claims that they were unconscious for only 30 seconds. For example, Chief Medical Officer Dr. Crusher has found moss samples that show a full day of growth, and has found that Worf, complaining of a sore wrist, actually had his wrist broken and reset by a medical professional. Picard begins to suspect Data's claims, and believes the rest of the crew is suffering from missing time syndrome. Picard confronts Data on the issue, but Data cannot provide a rational answer. Further studies of the crew by Dr. Crusher show that Data's explanations are impossible; they have lost a day from the wormhole encounter, and there is evidence that Data tampered with the probe's readings to mask the Class M planet. Picard recognizes that Data's actions may be for the protection of the Enterprise, but orders the ship to return to the system.

When they near the Class M planet, Ship's Counselor Troi is taken over by a mysterious energy pulse from the system, and starts to speak to the crew with a different voice. The entity that has taken over Troi informs Data that the plan has failed, and that their people will prepare to destroy the Enterprise. Picard learns from Data and the entity that they are in the space of the Paxans, a highly advanced but very xenophobic race who have kept themselves hidden by firing a stun beam at any ship that nears their system and then moving it away; crews of such ships normally associate it with the effects of a wormhole and leave without incident. However, in the case of the Enterprise, the stun beam did not affect Data; Data had revived the crew as the Paxans were attempting to move the ship, forcing a physical encounter that led to Worf's wrist being broken. Picard was able to offer the Paxans a deal as to attempt to conceal their previous meeting, using memory-wiping technology from the Paxans to forget their encounters with them, and ordered Data to behave as he did to protect the ship.

Picard is able to convince the Paxan in control of Troi that the previous plan failed because they left too many clues on the Enterprise that piqued human curiosity to solve the mystery and that if the Enterprise vanishes, it will cause others to come and investigate. The crew of the Enterprise, with the help of the Paxans, work together to completely eradicate any possible clues; once completed, the crew is stunned again, and the ship moves away from Paxan space. When the crew revives this time, they accept Data's explanations without question and continue on their mission.

Similarity to Red Dwarf
In their book The Red Dwarf Programme Guide, Chris Howarth and Steve Lyons point out the "uncanny similarities" between Clues and the Red Dwarf episode "Thanks for the Memory", which aired on UK television nearly two and a half years earlier. Howarth and Lyons note that the American show "has the cast waking up to find that time has passed of which they have no memory. Despite the resistance of their mechanical crew member, they attempt to find out what has happened, but learn that they were better off not knowing. One of them even has a broken limb..."

Reception
In 2012, Wired magazine said this was one of the best episodes of Star Trek: The Next Generation.

In 2016, Vox rated this one of the top 25 essential episodes of all Star Trek.

In 2017, Netflix announced that "Clues" was among the top ten most re-watched Star Trek episodes on their streaming service, excluding the first two episodes of each series. Also in 2017, Popular Mechanics said that "Clues" was one of the top ten most fun episodes of Star Trek: The Next Generation, praising it as good science fiction television and a good plot twist.

Medium.com ranked this the 55th best episode Star Trek: The Next Generation in 2017.

In 2020, SyFy Wire noted this episode for its relationship between Picard and Data, which pits Data's loyalty against the ability of others to trust him.

Home video 
This episode was released in the United States on September 3, 2002, as part of the Star Trek: The Next Generation season four DVD box set. On May 25, 1996, episodes "Devil's Due" and "Clues" were released on LaserDisc in the United States. Published by Paramount Home Video, the single double sided disc retailed for 34.95. The 12" video disc was in NTSC format with a Dolby Surround audio track. CBS announced on September 28, 2011, in celebration of the series' twenty-fifth anniversary, that Star Trek: The Next Generation would be completely re-mastered in 1080p high definition from the original 35 mm film negatives. For the remaster almost 25,000 reels of original film stock were rescanned and re-edited; all visual effects were digitally recomposed from original large-format negatives and newly created CGI shots. The release was accompanied by 7.1 DTS Master Audio. On July 30, 2013 "Clues" was released in 1080p high definition as part of the Season 4 Blu-ray box set in the United States. The set was released on July 29, 2013, in the United Kingdom.

References

 Star Trek The Next Generation DVD set, volume 4, disc 4, selection 2.

External links
 
 "Clues" rewatch by Keith R. A. DeCandido

Star Trek: The Next Generation (season 4) episodes
1991 American television episodes
Television episodes about amnesia
Television episodes directed by Les Landau